Newport is an area of Barnstaple, in the North Devon district, in the county of Devon, England, situated one mile south-east of the historic centre of Barnstaple, between that town and Bishops Tawton, on the east side of the River Taw. It is now part of the suburbs of Barnstaple.  Few ancient buildings survive, the "Old Dairy" being a notable exception.

History
Newport was a borough founded in the late 13th century by a Bishop of Exeter within his manor of Bishops Tawton, to serve as a rival to the river port of Barnstaple, a short distance downstream. A deed dated 1425 seen by Risdon (d.1640) evidences the existence of a mayor of the borough. It came within the administration of the town of Barnstaple in 1836.

Church
A chapel dedicated to St John was in ruins as mentioned by Risdon (d.1640). A chapel of ease (administered by the parish church of Bishops Tawton about one mile to the south) was built in 1820, replaced by the surviving parish church of St John the Baptist in South Street, built in 1883.

References

Populated places in Devon
Barnstaple